Harold 'Harry' Whittle (2 May 1922 – 11 May 1990) was a British hurdler and long jumper. He competed in the 400 metres hurdles at the 1948 Summer Olympics and the 1952 Summer Olympics.

He also represented England in four events at the 1950 British Empire Games in Auckland, New Zealand; the 440 yards, 440 yards hurdles, long jump and triple jump. He was a three times long jump national champion.

References

1922 births
1990 deaths
Athletes (track and field) at the 1948 Summer Olympics
Athletes (track and field) at the 1952 Summer Olympics
British male hurdlers
British male long jumpers
Olympic athletes of Great Britain
Place of birth missing
Athletes (track and field) at the 1950 British Empire Games
Commonwealth Games competitors for England